Languedocien (French name), Languedocian or Lengadocian, is an Occitan dialect spoken in rural parts of southern France such as Languedoc, Rouergue, Quercy, Agenais and Southern Périgord. It is sometimes also called Languedocien-Guyennais. Due to its central position among the dialects of Occitan, it is often used as a basis for a Standard Occitan.

About 10% of the population of Languedoc are fluent in the language (about 300,000), and another 20% (600,000) "have some understanding" of the language. All speak French as their first or second language.

Geographic distribution 
Languedocien is spoken in certain parts of three French regions.

 Occitanie: Aveyron, Lot, Tarn, Tarn-et-Garonne except Lomagne, Ariège (except a western part), Haute-Garonne (except the districts of Saint-Gaudens and Muret), Aude, Hérault, Lozère, western and northern parts of Gard and Fenouillèdes.
 Nouvelle-Aquitaine: south of the Dordogne, east of the Gironde, north-eastern two-thirds of Lot-et-Garonne, the southern fringe of Corrèze.
 Auvergne-Rhône-Alpes: area of Bas-Vivarois, Languedocien-Nord-Cévenol

Other dialects spoken in these areas include: Gascon, Catalan, Limousin, Basque, and Auvergnat.

Characteristics 
The following are the main characteristics of the Languedocien dialect:

 occlusives are kept at the end of a word: cantat [kanˈtat] (in Provençal: [kãnˈta]);
 preservation of the final s of a word: los òmes [luˈzɔmes] (in Limousin: [luzɔˈmej]);
 the final n of a word is dropped: occitan [utsiˈta] (in Provençal: [usiˈtãn]);
 absence of palatalisation of CA and GA groups: cantar, gal (in Auvergnat: chantar, jal);
 preservation of the final l of a word (i.e. not vocalised): provençal (in Provençal and in Gascon: provençau);
 lack of distinction between the sounds b and v (betacism): vin [bi] (in Auvergnat, Limousin and Provençal: [vji], [vi], [vin]).

None of these characteristics are unique to Languedocien; many are shared with one or more other Occitan dialects. Languedocien is both a central and conservative dialect. For these reasons, certain linguists are in favour of a standardisation of Occitan using Languedocien as a basis for this.

Variations 

Languedocien encompasses a number of variations, the classification of which is still ongoing.

Jules Ronjat gives three sub-groups:

 Eastern Languedocien dialects: Alésien, Montpelliérain, Lodévois, and Bitterrois (the latter tending towards Western Languedocien).
 Western Languedocien dialects: Narbonnais, Carcassonnais, Toulousain (including Fuxéen and Capcinois), Albigeois, Montalbanais, Agenais (the latter tending towards Guyennais and Gascon).
 Guyennais dialects: Rouergat, Gévaudanais (Lozère, Cévennes), Quercinois, Aurillacois, Sarladais, Bergeracois.
 He also classes Bas-Vivarois as a Languedocien dialect but separate from the above categories.

Louis Alibert uses four sub-groups:

 Eastern dialects: Cévenol, Montpelliérain, Bitterois.
 Southern dialects: Toulousain, Fuxéen, Donezanais, Narbonnais, "Central" (Carcassonais), Agenais.
 Western dialects: Bergeracois, Villeneuvois, Sarladais, Haut-Quercinois, Bas-Quercinois, Albigeois.
 Northern dialects: Aurillacois, Rouergat, Gévaudanais.

Domergue Sumien defines the categories thus:

 Eastern dialects: Cévenol, Montpelliérain.
 Southern dialects: Toulousain, Fuxéen, Donezanais, Narbonnais, Carcassonais.
 Western dialects: Bas-Quercinois, Albigeois, Agenais, Bitterois.
 Northern dialects: Bergeracois, Villeneuvois, Sarladais, Haut-Quercinois, Aurillacois, Rouergat, Gévaudanais, Bas-Vivarois.

In their supra-dialectal classification of Occitan, Pierre Bec and Domergue Sumien divide Languedocien into one or two supra-dialectal groups:

 Pierre Bec places Southern Languedocien dialects in the Aquitanian-Pyrenean group and the rest of the Languedocien dialects in the Central Occitanian group.
 Domergue Sumien classifies these Languedocien dialects similarly, but groups both Aquitanian-Pyrenean and Central Occitanian under the title of Pre-Iberian.

Usage 
With the absence of a linguistic census, it is difficult to obtain exact figures on the number of speakers. The most recent global studies on Occitan say the number of speakers ranges from 500,000 to 700,000 for the language as a whole. UNESCO, which is the only organisation to treat Languedocien independently, estimates the number at around 500,000, and considers the language under serious threat.

See also 
 Occitan conjugation
 Languages of France
 Langue d'oc
 Émile Mazuc, scholar of the Languedocien language

References

Occitan language
Languages of France